U.S. Army Freedom Team Salute (FTS) was an official U.S. Army Commendation Program sponsored by the Secretary of the Army and U.S. Army Chief of Staff. The Freedom Team Salute Program began in 2005 and ceased operation at the end of February 2010. Over 2.3 million Commendations were issued by the program during its five years of operation.

The Program recognized:
 The Parents and Spouses of Active Duty Soldiers
 The Parents, Spouses, and Employers of Army National Guard and Reserve Soldiers
 Honorably Discharged Army Veterans
 All Army Supporters who have contributed to the U.S. Army mission and its Soldiers

All recipients of the Freedom Team Salute Commendation received a personalized letter and certificate of appreciation signed by both the Secretary of the Army and Army Chief of Staff, and an official U.S Army lapel pin.

References

External links
 Official U.S. Army web site
 Secretary of the Army
 Army Chief of Staff
 General Petraeus Honors Stephen Colbert with the FTS Commendation
 Devotion to D.C. Beyond Words
 Department of the Army's Freedom Team Salute
 DeRidder officials commended for supporting Army and its mission
 Thank You Cards from Across America Sent to Troops for Thanksgiving Holiday
 Thanksgiving spirit sweeps across Army
 Columbus Blue Jackets Celebrate Veterans Day with Military Appreciation Night on November 11
 Students, WWII veterans find common ground
 Veterans Day: School program honors veterans at North Butler
 Ind. veteran receives milestone award
 Brigadier General Rebecca Halstead Helps Parker College Honor Our Nation’s Heroes
 Freedom Team Salute offers holiday recognition
 John Campbell teacher receives high praise from the U.S. Army
 Army Veteran Honored
 Veterans Seek To Help, Honor Other Vets
 OPINION: Salute from an ex-soldier

United States Army projects